Tom Nijssen and Cyril Suk were the defending champions, but lost in the semifinals this year.

Jakob Hlasek and Marc Rosset won the title, defeating Neil Broad and Stefan Kruger 6–1, 6–3 in the final.

Seeds

  Jakob Hlasek /  Marc Rosset (champions)
  Tom Nijssen /  Cyril Suk (semifinals)
  Steve DeVries /  David Macpherson (first round)
  Mark Kratzmann /  Wally Masur (semifinals)

Draw

Draw

External links
Draw

Doubles
1992 ATP Tour